Robert Endre Tarjan (born April 30, 1948) is an American computer scientist and mathematician.  He is the discoverer of several graph algorithms, including Tarjan's strongly connected components algorithm, and co-inventor of both splay trees and Fibonacci heaps. Tarjan is currently the James S. McDonnell Distinguished University Professor of Computer Science at Princeton University.

Personal life and education
He was born in Pomona, California. His father, raised in Hungary, was a child psychiatrist, specializing in mental retardation, and ran a state hospital. As a child, Tarjan read a lot of science fiction, and wanted to be an astronomer. He became interested in mathematics after reading Martin Gardner's mathematical games column in Scientific American. He became seriously interested in math in the eighth grade, thanks to a "very stimulating" teacher.

While he was in high school, Tarjan got a job, where he worked with IBM punch card collators. He first worked with real computers while studying astronomy at the Summer Science Program in 1964.

Tarjan obtained a Bachelor's degree in mathematics from the California Institute of Technology in 1969.  At Stanford University, he received his master's degree in computer science in 1971 and a Ph.D. in computer science (with a minor in mathematics) in 1972. At Stanford, he was supervised by Robert Floyd and  Donald Knuth, both highly prominent computer scientists, and his Ph.D. dissertation was An Efficient Planarity Algorithm. Tarjan selected computer science as his area of interest because he believed that computer science was a way of doing mathematics that could have a practical impact.

Tarjan now lives in Princeton, NJ, and Silicon Valley.  He is married to Nayla Rizk.
He has three daughters:  Alice Tarjan, Sophie Zawacki, and Maxine Tarjan.

Computer science career
Tarjan has been teaching at Princeton University since 1985. He has also held academic positions at Cornell University (1972–73), University of California, Berkeley (1973–1975), Stanford University (1974–1980), and New York University (1981–1985). He has also been a fellow of the NEC Research Institute (1989–1997). In April 2013 he joined Microsoft Research Silicon Valley in addition to the position at Princeton. In October 2014 he rejoined Intertrust Technologies as chief scientist.

Tarjan has worked at AT&T Bell Labs (1980–1989), Intertrust Technologies (1997–2001, 2014–present), Compaq (2002) and Hewlett Packard (2006–2013).

Algorithms and data structures
Tarjan is known for his pioneering work on graph theory algorithms and data structures. Some of his well-known algorithms include Tarjan's off-line least common ancestors algorithm, and Tarjan's strongly connected components algorithm, and he was one of five co-authors of the median of medians linear-time selection algorithm. The Hopcroft–Tarjan planarity testing algorithm was the first linear-time algorithm for planarity testing.

Tarjan has also developed important data structures such as the Fibonacci heap (a heap data structure consisting of a forest of trees), and the splay tree (a self-adjusting binary search tree; co-invented by Tarjan and Daniel Sleator). Another significant contribution was the analysis of the disjoint-set data structure; he was the first to prove the optimal runtime involving the inverse Ackermann function.

Awards
Tarjan received the Turing Award jointly with John Hopcroft in 1986.  The citation for the award states that it was:

Tarjan was also elected an ACM Fellow in 1994.  The citation for this award states:

Some of the other awards for Tarjan include:
 Nevanlinna Prize in Information Science (1983) – first recipient
Member of the American Academy of Arts and Sciences, elected 1985
 National Academy of Sciences Award for Initiatives in Research (1984)
Member of the National Academy of Sciences, elected 1987
Member of the National Academy of Engineering, elected 1988
Member of the American Philosophical Society, elected 1990
 Paris Kanellakis Award in Theory and Practice, ACM (1999)
 Caltech Distinguished Alumni Award, California Institute of Technology (2010)

Selected publications

Tarjan's papers have been collectively cited over 90,000 times.  Among the most cited are:

 1972: Depth-first search and linear graph algorithms, R Tarjan, SIAM Journal on Computing 1 (2), 146-160
	
1987: Fibonacci heaps and their uses in improved network optimization algorithms, ML Fredman, RE Tarjan, Journal of the ACM (JACM) 34 (3), 596-615
	
1983: Data structures and network algorithms, RE Tarjan, Society for industrial and Applied Mathematics
	
1988: A new approach to the maximum-flow problem, V Goldberg, RE Tarjan, Journal of the ACM (JACM) 35 (4), 921-940

Patents

Tarjan holds at least 18 U.S. patents. These include:

 J. Bentley, D. Sleator, and R. E. Tarjan, U. S. Patent 4,796,003, Data Compaction, 1989
 N. Mishra, R. Schreiber, and R. E. Tarjan, U. S. Patent 7,818,272, Method for discovery of clusters of objects in an arbitrary undirected graph using a difference between a fraction of internal connections and maximum fraction of connections by an outside object, 2010
 B. Pinkas, S. Haber, R. E. Tarjan, and T. Sander, U. S. Patent 8220036, Establishing a secure channel with a human user, 2012

Notes

References
 
 
 OCLC entries for Robert E Tarjan

External links

List of Robert Tarjan's patents on IPEXL's Patent Directory
Robert Tarjan's home page at Princeton.

1948 births
Living people
Members of the United States National Academy of Sciences
American computer scientists
Theoretical computer scientists
Turing Award laureates
Nevanlinna Prize laureates
Fellows of the Association for Computing Machinery
Scientists at Bell Labs
California Institute of Technology alumni
Stanford University School of Engineering alumni
Princeton University faculty
People from Pomona, California
20th-century American Jews
21st-century American Jews
Fellows of the Society for Industrial and Applied Mathematics
Summer Science Program
Members of the United States National Academy of Engineering
Graph theorists
Members of the American Philosophical Society